African Rural University is a university in Uganda.

Location
The main campus of African Rural University is located in the town of Kagadi, Kagadi District, Bunyoro sub-region in the Western Region of Uganda. The coordinates of the university are 0°56'32.0"N, 30°49'10.0"E (Latitude:0.942222; Longitude:30.819444).

History
African Rural University was established in 2006 and accredited by the Uganda National Council for Higher Education in 2011.

It was the first university in Africa that has focused on teaching sustainable agriculture exclusively to women. The course work is 60 percent theoretical teaching and 40 percent practical implementation.

Academics
, the university offered only one degree course, the Bachelor of Science in Technologies for Rural Transformation. It is a four-year course, consisting of three years of academic study and one year of practical field activity. Each year of classroom study is divided into two semesters lasting seventeen weeks each. Each admission class is limited to thirty female students. There are plans to introduce degrees in agribusiness and rural finance.

See also

Education in Uganda
Agriculture in Uganda
List of university leaders in Uganda
List of universities in Uganda

References

External links
 Official Webpage

Universities and colleges in Uganda
Agriculture in Uganda
Kagadi District
Bunyoro sub-region
Western Region, Uganda
Educational institutions established in 2009
2009 establishments in Uganda